Fiji competed at the 1996 Summer Paralympics in Atlanta, United States. Fiji was making its return to the Paralympic Games, having been absent since 1976. The country was represented by two athletes, Elia Sarisoso and Joseva Verivou, both competing in track and field. Neither won any medals.

See also
Fiji at the 1996 Summer Olympics

References

Nations at the 1996 Summer Paralympics
1996
Paralympics